Joslyn Chavarria (born 18 April 1959) is a Belizean former cyclist. He competed in the individual road race and the team time trial events at the 1984 Summer Olympics.

References

External links
 

1959 births
Living people
Belizean male cyclists
Olympic cyclists of Belize
Cyclists at the 1984 Summer Olympics
Place of birth missing (living people)